Francis Jammes (2 December 1868, in Tournay, Hautes-Pyrénées – 1 November 1938, in Hasparren, Pyrénées-Atlantiques) was a French and European poet. He spent most of his life in his native region of Béarn and the Basque Country and his poems are known for their lyricism and for singing the pleasures of a humble country life (donkeys, maidens). His later poetry remained lyrical, but also included a strong religious element brought on by his (re)conversion to Catholicism in 1905.

Biography

Jammes was a mediocre student and failed his baccalauréat with a zero for French. His first poems began to be read in Parisian literary circles around 1895, and were appreciated for a fresh tone breaking away from symbolism. 

In 1896 Jammes travelled to Algeria with André Gide. He fraternised with other writers, including Stéphane Mallarmé and Henri de Régnier. His most famous collection of poems — De l'angélus de l'aube à l'angélus du soir ("From morning Angelus to evening Angelus") — appeared in 1897 in the Mercure de France; Le Deuil des Primevères ("The Mourning of Primulas") (1901) was also well received. Working up to that point as a notary's clerk, Jammes was then able to make a living from his writing. In 1905, influenced by the poet Paul Claudel to whom he became close, he converted to a practicing  Catholicism. His poetry became more austere and sometimes dogmatic.

In the eyes of Parisian literary circles, Francis Jammes was generally considered a solitary provincial who chose to live a life of retreat in his mountainous Pyrenees, and his poems never became entirely fashionable. The author sought nomination to the Académie française several times, but was never elected.

Jammes was the original author of Georges Brassens's song La Prière ("The Prayer"). The lyrics were taken from the poem Les Mystères douloureux ("The Agonies of Christ") published in the collection L'Église habillée de feuilles ("The Church Clothed in Leaves") (1906); Brassens changed some of the words to make the text more rhythmic.

Jammes was known to have an ardent passion for field sports, especially game hunting. He was known to have also been a believer in the conservation of endangered species.

Thirteen poems from his cycle Tristesses ("Sorrows"), were set to music by composer Lili Boulanger in 1914 under the title Clairières dans le ciel ("Clearings in the Sky") a title Jammes had given to an assorted collection of poetry of which Tristesses was a part. The whole cycle was composed for soprano, flute and piano by Michel Bosc.

Works

Poetry
Each year links to its corresponding "[year] in poetry" article:
 1891: Six Sonnets
 1892: Vers, also 1893 and 1894
 1895: Un jour
 1897: La Naissance du poète ("The Birth of the Poet")
 1898: Quatorze prières
 1898: De l'Angélus de l'aube à l'Angélus du soir ("From the Morning Prayer to the Evening Prayer")
 1899: Le Poète et l'oiseau ("The Poet and the Bird")
 1899: La Jeune Fille nue
 1900–1901: Le Triomphe de la vie
 1901: Le Deuil des primevères
 1902–1906: Clairières dans le ciel
 1905: Tristesses
 1906: Clairières dans le Ciel
 1906: L'Eglise habillée de feuilles
 1906: Le Triomphe de la vie
 1908: Poèmes mesurés
 1908: Rayons de miel, Paris: Bibliothèque de l'Occident
 1911–1912: Les Géorgiques chrétiennes ("Christian Georgics"), three volumes
 1913: Feuilles dans le vent
 1916: Cinq prières pour le temps de la guerre, Paris: Librairie de l'Art catholique
 1919: La Vierge et les sonnets, Paris: Mercure de France
 1921: Épitaphes, Paris: Librairie de l'Art catholic
 1921: Le Tombeau de Jean de la Fontaine, Paris: Mercure de France
 1922, 1923, 1924, 1925, Livres des quatrains
 1923: La Brebis égarée
 1923–1925 Les Quatrains, in four volumes
 1925: Brindilles pour rallumer la foi, Paris: Éditions Spes
 1926: Ma France poétique, Paris: Mercure de France
 1928: Diane 1931: L'Arc-en-ciel des amours, Paris: Bloud et Gay
 1935: Alouette 1935: De tout temps à jamais, Paris: Gallimard
 1936: Sources, Paris: Le Divan
 1943: Elégies et poésies diverses 1946: La GrâceProse

Each year links to its corresponding "[year] in literature" article:
 1899: Clara d'Ellébeuse; ou, L'Histoire d'une ancienne jeune fille 1901: Almaïde d'Etremont; ou, L'Histoire d'une jeune fille passionée 1903: Le Roman du lièvre 1904: Pomme d'Anis; ou, L'Histoire d'une jeune fille infirme 1906: Pensée des jardins 1910: Ma fille Bernadette 1916: Le Rosaire au soleil, Paris: Mercure de France
 1918: Monsieur le Curé d'Ozeron 1919: Une vierge, Paris: Édouard-Joseph
 1919: Le Noël de mes enfants, Paris: Édouard-Joseph
 1919: La Rose à Marie, Paris: Édouard-Joseph
 1920: Le Poète rustique, Paris: Mercure de France
 1921: Le Bon Dieu chez les enfants 1921: De l'âge divin à l'âge ingrat, the first of three volumes of his memoirs, followed by L'Amour, les muses et la chasse, 1922; Les Caprices du poète, 1923
 1921: Le Livre de saint Joseph, Paris: Plon-Nourrit
 1922: Le Poète et l'inspiration, Nîmes, France: Gomès
 1923: Cloches pour deux mariages, Paris: Mercure de France
 1925: Les Robinsons basques 1926: Trente-six femmes, Paris: Mercure de France
 1926: Basses-Pyrénées, Paris: Émile-Paul
 1927: Lavigerie 1928: Janot-poète 1928: Les Nuits qui me chantent 1928: La Divine Douleur 1930: Champétreries et méditations 1930: Leçons poétiques, Paris: Mercure de France
 1932: L'Antigyde; ou, Elie de Nacre 1934: Le Crucifix du poète, Paris: M. deHartoy
 1936: Le Pèlerin de Lourdes, Paris: Gallimard
 1938: La Légende de l'aile; ou, Marie-Elisabeth 1941: Saint Louis; ou, L'Esprit de la Croisade, Paris: F. Sorlot

References

Further reading
 Lowell, Amy (1915). "Francis Jammes." In: Six French Poets.'' New York: The Macmillan Company, pp. 211–268.

External links

 
 
 
 Poems by Francis Jammes
 Official site (in French)
 Francis Jammes au Club des Poètes (in French)
 Selection of poems (in French)
 
 Francis Jammes Index des titres ou incipits

1868 births
1938 deaths
People from Hautes-Pyrénées
French poets
French Roman Catholics
French male poets